Richard Wall (born in Ballybunion, County Kerry) is an Irish film, television and theatre actor.
He is known for roles such as Robert Power in TV series The House and also Sgt. Thornton in the IFTA nominated Anton

After completing his studies in Creative Arts and Theatre at Lorenzo de' Medici School in Florence, Italy, he trained as an actor at Herbert Berghof Studio in New York. Wall also used this time to attain his Series 7 and 63 licences by successfully completing the General Securities Representative Exam and Uniform Securities Agent State Law Exam. Before taking up acting as his chosen career, he spent a number of years working as a trader in a New York Investment Bank which specialized in Day Trading.

Wall was one of the main cast in Whatever Turns You On, which won the Best Short Award at the Aspen Shortsfest in Colorado which made it eligible for consideration for the 82nd Academy Awards. The film also won Best Short Film at Florence International Film Festival Italy 2009, the award for Best Irish Short Film at the Kerry Film Festival 2008 and the Audience Award at Filmstock International Film Festival 2008 in Britain. In the same month it was short-listed for the award of Best Short Film at the Boston Irish Film Festival and received a theatrical release in Ireland and France. The short has also been snapped up by TV stations in Poland, Ireland, Belgium, France and the UK Channel 4

Television credits include TG4 series Marú. Saor Sinn ó Olc, a bilingual drama series in both the Gaelic and English languages and also 6 Degrees''' which airs on BBC Television.

Wall is listed as Project Manager on a major photographic exhibition Faces of Ireland''  is a series of photographic portraits of people of Ireland representing each of the island's 32 counties. Many of Ireland's most famous faces have participated including Graeme McDowell, Rory McIlroy, Pierce Brosnan, Darren Clarke, Sarah Bolger, Neil Jordan, Sinéad O'Connor, Seamus Heaney, Brian O'Driscoll, Colm Toibin, Mary McAleese, Gabriel Byrne, and Enda Kenny. It can be seen at Dublin Airport's Terminal 2.

References

Living people
Irish male film actors
1977 births
Irish male television actors
People from County Kerry